Mitochondrial import receptor subunit TOM40B is a protein that in humans is encoded by the TOMM40L gene.

References

Further reading